Taguiporo is the name of the following Philippines barangays:

 Taguiporo, Bangui, Ilocos Norte
 Taguiporo, Bantay, Ilocos Sur
 Taguiporo, Santa Ignacia, Tarlac